Try Harder Records was a small independent record label that released music by Tired Irie, Blood Red Shoes, Foals, Jonquil, Redjetson, Blanket and Pioneers Press author/"talking songs" musician Adam Gnade.  The label was founded in late 2005 by Alan English, guitarist with Youthmovies, Sim O'Farrell, and Simon Cope. Its final release was in 2009.

Records released
The Joy Formidable Cradle Double 7" Single
Adam Gnade Trailerparks Limited CD tour-only version
Playdoe Sibot & Spoek are Playdoe Digital-only release
Larsen B Marilyn 7" Single
Tired Irie Hexagon CD Single
Tired Irie Tired Irie CD EP
Blanket Blankit CD Album
Redjetson The Unravelling 7" Single
Jonquil Lions CD Album
Adam Gnade and  Youthmovies Honey Slides CD EP
Jonquil Sunny Casinos CD Album
Blood Red Shoes ADHD 7" Single
FoalsTry This On Your Piano 7" Single
Blood Red Shoes Stitch Me Back 7" Single
Tired Irie Like. Gentle. Men. 7" Single

External links
 Try Harder Records website
 Try Harder Records myspace

British record labels